Aun Pornmoniroth (born 1 October 1965) is a Cambodian politician and economist, currently serving as the Minister of Economy and Finance and Deputy Prime Minister. He was the Economic Adviser to the Prime Minister from 1998 to 2013. Before his appointment as minister, he worked in the Ministry of Economy and Finance as Secretary of State. He is also a Member of Parliament (MP) for Kandal Province, first elected in 2018.

Life and career
Aun Pornmoniroth was born in 1965 in Cambodia's capital, Phnom Penh. An economist, he has served in the Ministry of Economy and Finance of Cambodia since 1994. His first post began in September 1993, as the assistant to Prime Minister Hun Sen until February 1994. In December 1998, he became Economic Adviser to the Prime Minister, with the rank of Secretary of State. On 6 February 1999, he was appointed as the Secretary-General of the Ministry of Economy and Finance. He is a member of the Board of Governors of the Royal School of Administration and the National Bank of Cambodia.

In 2013, he was chosen to succeed outgoing finance minister Keat Chhon and assumed the office on 24 September 2013. Moniroth is also the Chairman of the Supreme National Economic Council (since September 2001).

He has been mentioned as a potential candidate to be prime minister.

Academic achievements
Aun  is a graduate of the Moscow State University where he received a Doctor of Philosophy in social and political sciences. He is fluent in English and Russian.

Personal life 
Pornmoniroth is married to Im Paulika, and has one son, Aun Pornmonireach, who is married to the granddaughter of Lau Meng Khin. He holds Cypriot citizenship.

Awards and honours

 Grand Order of National Merit, February 2010
 Grand Cross of the Order of HM The Queen Kossamak Neariroth, February 2010  
 Grand Cross of the Royal Order of Sowathara, September 2008
 Grand Officer of the Royal Order of Cambodia, April 2003

References

1965 births
21st-century Cambodian politicians 
Living people
Agriculture ministers 
Government ministers of Cambodia
Deputy Prime Ministers of Cambodia
Finance ministers of Cambodia
Cambodian People's Party politicians
Moscow State University alumni
People from Phnom Penh
Members of the National Assembly (Cambodia)
Cypriot people of Cambodian descent
People with acquired Cypriot citizenship